Tereszpol-Zygmunty  is a village in Biłgoraj County, Lublin Voivodeship, in eastern Poland.

The village has a population of 766.

On May 2, 2021, An F2 tornado caused major damage in the village. Several buildings were damaged or destroyed.

References

Villages in Biłgoraj County